Club Social y Deportivo Mixco is a Guatemalan football club based in Mixco, a municipality in the Guatemala City metropolitan area. They play in the Liga Nacional, the top tier of Guatemalan football, after achieving promotion during the Clausura 2022 Primera Division.

In 2018, the club founded their new stadium Santo Domingo de Guzmán, until then they played at the Estadio Julio Armando Cobar in San Miguel Petapa.

In the Apertura 2010 they played their home games at the Estadio Municipal San Miguel Dueñas.

History
Nicknamed Los Chicharroneros, the club was founded in 1964 and made their debut at the Guatemalan second level in the 2001/2002 season. They got relegated in 2003 but went back in 2005 and have stayed there since.

Current squad

List of coaches
  Jaime García
  Francisco López
  Oscar Enrique Sánchez
  Palmiro Salas
 Juan Carlos Plata
 Walter Claverí
 Sergio Guevara
 Julio Gómez
 Douglas Sequeira
 Fabricio Benítez

References

External links
 Website – Deportivo Mixco

Mixco
Association football clubs established in 1964
1964 establishments in Guatemala